Wilcza Góra may refer to the following places:
Wilcza Góra, Kuyavian-Pomeranian Voivodeship (north-central Poland)
Wilcza Góra, Masovian Voivodeship (east-central Poland)
Wilcza Góra, Silesian Voivodeship (south Poland)